Harvey Frick (October 13, 1893 – May 6, 1966) was an American long-distance runner. He competed in the marathon at the 1928 Summer Olympics.

References

External links
 

1893 births
1966 deaths
Athletes (track and field) at the 1928 Summer Olympics
American male long-distance runners
American male marathon runners
Olympic track and field athletes of the United States
Track and field athletes from New York City
20th-century American people